Henry Muller (21 August 1902, Muhlbach-sur-Bruche (Bas-Rhin) – 15 November 1980, Paris) was a French writer, journalist and book publisher. He began to work for the publishing house Grasset in 1923 and ended his publishing career as Grasset's secretary-general. He recounted his memories from Grasset and interwar France in the books Trois pas en arrière and Six pas en arrière. He received the 1960 Prix Interallié for the novel Clem.

Bibliography 
 Les Deux Doigts de la mort, les Publications techniques et artistiques, 1945
 La mort est toujours à l'heure, les Publications techniques et artistiques, 1945
 Trois pas en arrière, éditions de la Table ronde, 1952
 Six pas en arrière, La Table ronde, 1954
 Nuit et jour à Paris, photographs by Yurek, J. Delmas and Cie, 1957
 Le Général Boulanger, dictateur ou roi de cœur, éditions Gallimard, 1959
 Clem, novel, la Table ronde, 1960
 L'Alsace..., with photographs by Pierre Tetrel, Jacques Fronval, Robert Laeuffer, Yan..., Éditions Sun, 1962
 L'espérance a raison, novel, La Table ronde, 1963
 L'an 2000, une révolution sans perdants, novel, éditions Plon, 1965
 Sans tambour ni trompette - Malraux, Mauriac, Daninos, Maurois..., éditions La Palatine, 1968
 Le Figurant, éditions Grasset, 1976
 Retours de mémoire, éditions Grasset, 1979
 Mes sans jour, la Table ronde

References 

People from Bas-Rhin
1902 births
1980 deaths
French book publishers (people)
20th-century French journalists
20th-century French novelists
Prix Interallié winners